Poverty Inc. may refer to 
 Poverty, Inc., a 2014 film by Michael Matheson Miller
 Poverty Inc. (Gary Null film), a 2014 film by Gary Null
 A fall 1993 issue of Southern Exposure magazine